Mountainaire is a census-designated place (CDP) in Coconino County, Arizona, United States. The population was 1,119 at the 2010 census.

Geography
Mountainaire is located at  (35.091096, -111.660193).

According to the United States Census Bureau, the CDP has a total area of 10.2 square miles (26.5 km2), all  land.

Mountainaire CDP includes Kachina Hills and Mountainaire subdivisions, and nearby areas.

Climate
This region experiences warm (but not hot) and dry summers, with no average monthly temperatures above 71.6 °F.  According to the Köppen Climate Classification system, Mountainaire has a warm-summer Mediterranean climate, abbreviated "Csb" on climate maps.

Demographics

As of the census of 2000, there were 1,014 people, 417 households, and 246 families living in the CDP. The racial makeup of the CDP was 86.1% White, 0.3% Black or African American, 7.7% Native American, 0.3% Asian, 0.1% Pacific Islander, 3.1% from other races, and 2.5% from two or more races.  6.6% of the population were Hispanic or Latino of any race.

There were 417 households, out of which 31.4% had children under the age of 18 living with them, 46.8% were married couples living together, 8.2% had a female householder with no husband present, and 41.0% were non-families. 26.6% of all households were made up of individuals, and 4.1% had someone living alone who was 65 years of age or older.  The average household size was 2.43 and the average family size was 3.04.

In the CDP, the age distribution of the population shows 24.7% under the age of 18, 8.5% from 18 to 24, 39.6% from 25 to 44, 23.5% from 45 to 64, and 3.7% who were 65 years of age or older.  The median age was 33 years. For every 100 females, there were 110.4 males.  For every 100 females age 18 and over, there were 107.6 males.

The median income for a household in the CDP was $41,250, and the median income for a family was $49,355. Males had a median income of $32,406 versus $27,125 for females. The per capita income for the CDP was $23,625.  About 5.3% of families and 7.4% of the population were below the poverty line, including 10.9% of those under age 18 and none of those age 65 or over.

References

External links
Beekeeping in Mountainaire
Mountainaire, AZ Weather Station
Highlands Fire District

Census-designated places in Coconino County, Arizona